Arderne may refer to:

Arderne Gardens, a public park in Cape Town, South Africa
James Arderne (1636–1691), English dean of Chester
John Arderne (1307–1392), English surgeon
Joseph Arderne Ormerod (1848–1925), English physician and neurologist

See also
 Ardern George Hulme Beaman (1857–1929), British author, diplomat and journalish
 Ardene, a Canadian clothing retailer